The 2018 CSIO Gijón was the 2018 edition of the Spanish official show jumping horse show, at Las Mestas Sports Complex in Gijón. It was held as CSIO 5*.

This edition of the CSIO Gijón was held between 29 August and 2 September.

Nations Cup
The Cup was a show jumping competition with two rounds, held on 31 August. The height of the fences were up to 1.60 meters. The best eight teams of the eleven which participated were allowed to start in the second round. The competition was endowed with €72,500. Seven years after their last success, Spain won its 4th Nations Cup in Gijón.

In bold, riders that contested the jump-off.

Gijón Grand Prix
The Gijón Grand Prix, the Show jumping Grand Prix of the 2018 CSIO Gijón, was the major show jumping competition at this event. The sponsor of this competition was Funeraria Gijonesa. It was held on Sunday, 2 September 2018. The competition was a show jumping competition over two rounds, the height of the fences were up to 1.60 meters.

It was endowed with 145,700 €. Richard Howley won the trophy.

(Top 10 of 50 Competitors)

Winners by day

References

External links
Official website of CSIO Gijón
All results of the CSIO Gijón 2018

CSIO Gijón
2018 in show jumping
FEI Nations Cup